JC Lattès is a French publishing house. A division of Hachette Livre since 1981,  JC Lattès' catalogue includes the works of Dan Brown, as well as Fifty Shades of Grey by E. L. James.

Founder Jean-Claude Lattès died on 17 January 2018.

Background
JC Lattès was founded in 1968 as Edition Speciale by Jean-Claude Lattès and Jacques Lanzmann. Lattès took it over in 1972, renamed it Éditions Jean-Claude Lattès, and ran it until 1981. JC Lattès currently has a catalog of more than 1000 titles. Its major successes include:
Un Sac de billes (A Bag of Marbles) by Joseph Joffo
Le Vent du soir (The Wind in the Evening) by Jean d'Ormesson
Le Nabab (The Nabob) by Irène Frain
Léon l'Africain (Leo Africanus) by Amin Maalouf
Fifty Shades of Grey by E. L. James 
The Red Scarves
The Officers
Geisha

Over the years, JC Lattès has published general-interest books by French and foreign authors, including both fiction and non-fiction.  Its authors have included Scott Turow, Dean Koontz, James Patterson, Jean-François Parot, Jean d'Aillon, Åke Edwardson, Lars Christensen Saabye, and Karin Fossum.

Notable novels in French
 Un sac de billes by Joseph Joffo
 Leo Africanus by Amin Maalouf
 Le Code De Vinci by Dan Brown

References

External links 
 

JC Lattès